The girls' shot put event at the 2010 Youth Olympic Games was held on 18–22 August 2010 in Bishan Stadium in Singapore.

Schedule

Results

Qualification

Finals

Final B

Final A

External links
 iaaf.org - Women's shot put
 

Athletics at the 2010 Summer Youth Olympics